Achillea cretica, Cretan yarrow, is a species of flowering plant in the family Asteraceae, native to Greece, the East Aegean Islands, Crete, Turkey, and Cyprus. It is typically found in calcareous rocky areas such as cliffs, gorges, scree fields, and even ancient ruins, and is somewhat tolerant of salty conditions.

References

cretica
Flora of Greece
Flora of Crete
Flora of the East Aegean Islands
Flora of Turkey
Flora of Cyprus
Plants described in 1753 
Taxa named by Carl Linnaeus